Lieutenant-Colonel Sir John Robert Chancellor  (20 October 1870 – 31 July 1952) was a British soldier and colonial administrator.

Biography
Chancellor was the younger son of Edward Chancellor, of Woodhall House, Juniper Green, Midlothian, and Anne Helen Tod (d. 1932), daughter of John Robert Tod, WS. The Chancellor family had held the lands of Shieldhill, Quothquan from 1432.

He attended the Royal Military Academy Sandhurst, and after graduation was commissioned into the British Army's Corps of Royal Engineers as a second lieutenant on 25 July 1890. Promoted to lieutenant on 25 July 1893, he took part in the 1896 Dongola Expedition under Sir Herbert Kitchener, and served in the 1897–98 Tirah campaign on the North West Frontier of British India as part of the Sirmoor Imperial Service Snappers. For his service in India he was mentioned in despatches, received the India Medal, and was awarded the Distinguished Service Order (DSO) in 1898. He was promoted to captain on 20 May 1901, and later served as Secretary of the Colonial Defence Committee.

After a career in the Royal Engineers he became a colonial administrator serving as the 20th Governor of Mauritius from 13 September 1911 to 28 January 1916, Trinidad and Tobago (1916–1921) and Southern Rhodesia (1923–1928). He also served as Principal Assistant Secretary to the Committee of Imperial Defence From 1922 to 1923.

In 1898 he was awarded the Distinguished Service Order (DSO). In 1909 he was appointed a Companion of the Order of St Michael and St George. He was knighted in the 1913 King's Birthday Honours when he was made a Knight Commander of the Order of St Michael and St George (KCMG). In the 1922 Dissolution Honours List he was promoted to Knight Grand Cross of the Order of St Michael and St George (GCMG). He was appointed a Knight of Justice in the Venerable Order of Saint John on 19 December 1928.

High Commissioner of Palestine

In 1928, he became High Commissioner of the British Mandate of Palestine, where he was perceived as being cool to Zionism and the Jewish people. Though he admired some Zionist leaders, in particular Pinhas Rutenberg, in general Chancellor's attitude towards Jews was negative. He wrote to his son that "truly the Jews are an ungrateful race". His attitude towards Arabs was politically supportive but paternalistic; he wrote to his son: "they are like children, and very difficult to help".

While he was in London in 1929, Arab riots protesting Jewish immigration broke out. On his return, he initially condemned Arab attacks but was subsequently less critical. He helped write Lord Passfield's White Paper of 1930, which aimed to reinterpret the Balfour Declaration. He left Palestine in 1931.

In 1931, Jerusalem's Straus Street was renamed Chancellor Avenue in his honour. The street reverted to its original name after the 1948 Arab-Israeli War.

In 1937 he was appointed chairman of the Livestock Commission, which was set up following the passing of the Livestock Industry Act, 1937. In the 1947 King's Birthday Honours he was created a Knight Grand Cross in the Civil Division of the Order of the British Empire (GBE) for services to the Ministry of Agriculture and Fisheries.

Family 
In 1903, Chancellor married Mary Elizabeth Howard (1881–1976), daughter of George Rodie Thompson, DL, JP, of Lynwood, Ascot, Berkshire. They had two children: a son, Christopher John Howard Chancellor (1904–1989), who married Sylvia Mary Paget in 1926; and a daughter, Elizabeth Rosemary Alice Chancellor (1906–1971), known as Rosemary, who married Air Chief Marshall William Elliot in 1931. Christopher and Sylvia had two children: John Paget Chancellor and Alexander Chancellor; Rosemary and William also had two children: Louise Elliot (Halsey) and Simon Elliot.

Legacy 
Chancellor Avenue in Salisbury, Southern Rhodesia, now Harare, Zimbabwe, was named after him and still bears his name. However, his grandson, Alexander Chancellor, suggested that it be changed on account of it now being the street on which Robert Mugabe, President of Zimbabwe lived.

References

External links

World Statesmen - Mauritius
World Statesmen - Israel

1870 births
1952 deaths
Military personnel from Edinburgh
Royal Engineers officers
Anti-Zionism in Mandatory Palestine
Colonial Administrative Service officers
Mandatory Palestine
British High Commissioners of Palestine
Companions of the Distinguished Service Order
Governors of Trinidad and Tobago
Governors of British Mauritius
Governors of Southern Rhodesia
Knights Grand Cross of the Order of St Michael and St George
Knights Grand Cross of the Royal Victorian Order
Knights Grand Cross of the Order of the British Empire
Civil servants from Edinburgh